Physatocheila variegata is a species of lace bug in the family Tingidae. It is found in North America.

Subspecies
These two subspecies belong to the species Physatocheila variegata:
 Physatocheila variegata ornata Van Duzee, 1917
 Physatocheila variegata variegata Parshley, 1916

References

Further reading

 
 

Tingidae
Articles created by Qbugbot
Insects described in 1916